Dymchenko is a Ukrainian surname. Notable people with the surname include:

 Diana Dymchenko (born 1989), Ukrainian rower
 Lyudmila Dymchenko (born 1977), Russian freestyle skier
 Serhiy Dymchenko (born 1967), Ukrainian high jumper

See also
 

Ukrainian-language surnames